Grace L. Dillon is an American academic and author. She is a professor in the Indigenous Nations Studies Program, in the School of Gender, Race, and Nations, at Portland State University.

Similar to the concept of Afrofuturism, Dillon is best known for coining the term Indigenous Futurism, which is a movement consisting of art, literature and other forms of media which express Indigenous perspectives of the past, present and future in the context of science fiction and related sub-genres.

Dillon is the editor of Walking the Clouds: An Anthology of Indigenous Science Fiction, which is the first anthology of Indigenous science fiction short stories, published by the University of Arizona Press in 2012. The anthology includes works from Gerald Vizenor, Leslie Marmon Silko, Sherman Alexie, William Sanders and Stephen Graham Jones. Previously, Dillon has edited Hive of Dreams: Contemporary Science Fiction from the Pacific Northwest, which was published in 2003 by Oregon State University Press. This is an anthology of science fiction from writers living in the Pacific Northwest, and features works from authors such as Greg Bear, Octavia Butler, and Molly Gloss.

Selected works 

 Hive of Dreams: Contemporary Science Fiction from the Pacific Northwest. Oregon State University Press. 2003.
 Indigenous Scientific Literacies in Nalo Hopkinson's Ceremonial Worlds. GL Dillon. Journal of the Fantastic in the Arts. 2007.
 Walking The Clouds: An Anthology Of Indigenous Science Fiction. University of Arizona Press. 2012.

References 

Year of birth missing (living people)
Living people
American women non-fiction writers
21st-century American non-fiction writers
Portland State University faculty
American women academics
21st-century American women writers